List of Australian sports songs covers songs written specifically about Australian sports, sports people, animals and sporting events. It excludes sports team songs or general songs that are anthems for sports events. For example, the song "Down Under" by Men at Work—which became the theme song for the crew of Australia II in their successful bid to win the 1983 America's Cup—is excluded.

Mike Brady, Greg Champion and John Williamson have specialised in writing and performing Australian sports songs. Two Australian sporting heroes, Sir Donald Bradman and Phar Lap, have several songs about them.

See also
List of Australian Football League team songs
 Australian rules football in Australian popular culture#Music

References

 
Australian songs
Australian Sports
Songs
Sports culture in Australia